Petra Bertholdová (born 24 November 1984) is a Czech football defender, currently playing for Sparta Prague in the Czech Women's First League.

She is a member of the Czech national team. She made her debut for the national team on 24 March 2002 in a match against Norway. On 17 September 2021, Bertholdová played her 100th match for Czech Republic in a 1–1 away draw with Netherlands in the 2023 FIFA Women's World Cup qualification (UEFA).

International goals
Statistics accurate as of match played 15 November 2022.

References

External links
 
 
 

1984 births
Living people
Czech women's footballers
Czech Republic women's international footballers
Sportspeople from Chomutov
Women's association football defenders
AC Sparta Praha (women) players
Czech Women's First League players
FIFA Century Club